Route 109 is a state highway in western Connecticut, running from New Milford to Thomaston.

Route description
Route 109 begins at an intersection with US 202 in New Milford and heads northeast into Washington, where if overlaps Route 47 for  before continuing into Morris.  In Morris, Route 109 heads east, then northeast and southeast, before cutting across a corner of Litchfield by the Wigwam Reservoir into Thomaston.  In Thomaston, Route 109 continues southeast and then east along the Wigwam Reservoir and Branch River to end at an intersection with US 6 and Route 254.

History
In 1922, the Bantam to Morris route was designated as State Highway 310. This became part of Route 109 when it was commissioned in 1932, running from the Bantam section of Litchfield past Bantam Lake to its current eastern terminus in Thomaston. In 1963, the section past Bantam Lake was reassigned to Route 209 and Route 109 was rerouted to its current western terminus using former SR 857. In 1968, the section near the Branch River in Thomaston was rerouted uphill to accommodate a flood control project.

Junction list

References

External links

109
Transportation in Litchfield County, Connecticut
New Milford, Connecticut
Washington, Connecticut
Morris, Connecticut
Thomaston, Connecticut